Hermann Dodojacek (born 5 August 1938) is an Austrian weightlifter. He competed in the men's featherweight event at the 1960 Summer Olympics.

References

1938 births
Living people
Austrian male weightlifters
Olympic weightlifters of Austria
Weightlifters at the 1960 Summer Olympics
People from Gänserndorf District
Sportspeople from Lower Austria
20th-century Austrian people